Copley Symphony Hall (originally the Fox Theatre) in San Diego, California, designed by Weeks and Day, opened in 1929 as the Fox Theatre (a  Gothic-revival luxury movie theater).  The hall was conferred to the San Diego Symphony in 1984.  It is also the location of some youth orchestra concerts in San Diegoincluding the San Diego Youth Symphony and Conservatory.

Downtown's Symphony Towers (the second tallest building in San Diego County) was built around Copley Hall in 1989.  The hall features an enormous pipe organ that is built into five walled chambers and was recently restored to its original splendor.  The hall has a seating capacity of 2,248. When it opened in 1929, it had a seating capacity of 2,876.

Snake Oil Cocktail Company services the food and beverage concession at the Symphony.

In early 2022, the San Diego Symphony announced that the Copley Symphony Hall at the Jacobs Music Center would be renovated for acoustic improvements and a major stage remodel including a choral terrace. A year later in early 2023, it was announced that the San Diego Symphony would be returning to the hall in a November 4 grand reopening concert.

Directors 
 Marc Wolff (1992-1995)
 Evan T. Papel (1999-2001)

See also
 List of concert halls

Notes

External links 

 Official Web Page
 Copley Symphony Hall at Cinema Treasures

Concert halls in California
Culture of San Diego
Buildings and structures in San Diego
Cinemas and movie theaters in California
Gothic Revival architecture in California
Tourist attractions in San Diego County, California
Event venues established in 1929
Performing arts centers in California
Public venues with a theatre organ
Weeks and Day buildings